Puerto Rico Highway 189 (PR-189) is a  long main highway which parallels very closely the first half of Puerto Rico Highway 30 from Caguas, Puerto Rico near downtown to Juncos, Puerto Rico passing through all three business centers of Caguas, Gurabo and Juncos. It ends at Puerto Rico Highway 31, and has no direct intersection with Puerto Rico Highway 198 although they are not separated by more than half a kilometer.

Major intersections

Related route

Puerto Rico Highway 9189 (PR-9189) is a spur route located in Gurabo. It branches off from PR-189 and provides access to several neighborhoods in Rincón.

See also

 List of highways numbered 189

References

External links

 Inauguran importante rampa de acceso del conector de la PR-9030 hacia la PR-30 en Gurabo 

189